Jason Anderson (born 16 December 1965) is a Canadian professional wrestler. He is best known for his work in Stampede Wrestling, where he was known under the ring names Blackheart Destruction and Jason Neidhart, being portrayed as the cousin of wrestler Jim Neidhart. He would wrestle internationally.

Professional wrestling career
Neidhart started his pro wrestling career in 1988 in Calgary for Stampede Wrestling as Jason Anderson. In 1989, he became Blackheart Destruction teameing with Blackheart Apocalypse (Tom Nash) as the Blackhearts. They feuded with Chris Benoit and Biff Wellington in Stampede.   

On July 8, 1991 he wrestled for WWF "Wrestling Challenge" losing to Ted DiBiase which aired on August 4.   

In 1993, Neidhart was Jud Jeet Singh, billed form India in the independent promotions in Calgary. In 1994, he wrestled in South Africa as Jason the Rebel for Maharaj Promotion. 1996 was the year he became Jason Neidhart and grew a long goatee portraying Jim Neidhart. In 1997, he made his debut in Germany for Catch Wrestling Association (CWA) teaming with Cannonball Grizzly and Robby Brookside. 

He lost to Duke Droese on January 18, 1998 in Mombasa, Kenya.  

Neidhart appeared on World Championship Wrestling's WCW Worldwide taping on March 30, 1999 losing to Scott Norton in Kitchener, Ontario. That same year he returned to both Germany and Calgary. 

In 2001, he worked for New Japan Pro Wrestling as Sledgehammer. During Neidhart's career he travelled to England, Philippines, Hungary, Austria, Lebanon, Abu Dhabi and Saudi Arabia. 

In 2009, he worked in Egypt where he lost to Al Snow and Gangrel. From 2013 to 2015, Neidhart wrestled in Qatar. In 2016, he wrestled in Sudan. That same year, he returned to Edmonton and retired from wrestling.

Championships and accomplishments
Prairie Wrestling Alliance
PWA Championship
Western Canada Extreme Wrestling
WCEW Extreme Heavyweight Champion (as Sledge Hammer)
Stampede Wrestling
Stampede International Tag Team Championship (1 times) - (as Blackheart Destruction) with Blackheart Apocalypse
Stampede Pacific Heavyweight Championship (1 time) (as Jason Neidhart)
Canadian Wrestling Hall of Fame
Class of 2000
 Tri-State Wrestling Alliance
TWA Tag Team Championship (1 time) – with Blackheart Apocalypse

References

External links 
 

1965 births
Canadian male professional wrestlers
Living people
Professional wrestlers from Calgary
Stampede Wrestling alumni
20th-century professional wrestlers
21st-century professional wrestlers
Stampede Wrestling International Tag Team Champions